Pirinia is a monotypic genus of flowering plants belonging to the family Caryophyllaceae. The only species is Pirinia koenigii.

Its native range is Southeastern Europe.

References

Caryophyllaceae
Monotypic Caryophyllaceae genera